The Cavalier's Cup is a mystery novel by the American writer John Dickson Carr (1906–1977), who published it under the name of Carter Dickson.  It is a locked room mystery and the final appearance in novel form of the series detective Sir Henry Merrivale and his long-time associate, Scotland Yard's Chief Inspector Humphrey Masters.

Plot summary

At Telford Old Hall, the past is a constant reminder in the present.  Long-dead Cavalier Sir Byng Rawdon still haunts the house, and lately has been making his ghostly presence known, it seems.

During his lifetime, he etched a poem into a leaded-glass window with a diamond that is a showpiece of the historic house, along with the heavily jeweled Cavalier's Cup, a family heirloom.

When Sir Henry Merrivale and Chief Inspector Masters arrive to debunk the ghost, Masters agrees to spend the night in the Oak Room with the doors locked and windows latched.

Masters falls asleep and, when he wakes up, he finds that the Cavalier's Cup has been moved from the locked safe and left standing on a nearby table.  Also, Sir Byng's sword, which was hanging outside the Oak Room, has been placed at Masters' feet.

Sir Henry and Masters must cope with Telford Old Hall's present-day inhabitants, a visiting American Congressman and Sir Henry's singing teacher in order to reveal who is behind the ghostly manifestations.

Publication history
 1953, US, William Morrow, Pub date 1953, Hardback, 263pp (first US edition)
 1954, UK, Heinemann, Pub date 1954, Hardback, 241pp (first UK edition)
 1960, UK, Pan G412, Pub date 1960, Paperback, 199pp (first UK pb edition)
 1987, US, Zebra , Pub date 1987, Paperback (first US pb edition)

1953 American novels
Novels by John Dickson Carr
Locked-room mysteries
William Morrow and Company books